The Devils Playground is a large sandy region in the Mojave Desert in the state of California in the United States. The Cronese Mountains are located at its northwestern edge. The "playground" lies between the town of Baker and the Providence Mountains.

The Devils Playground consists mostly of relatively flat plains except for some hills and small mountains at the northern end, where it merges with several dry lake beds, and the Kelso Dunes near the southern end of the area.

The Rasor Off-Highway Vehicle Area lies at the northwestern edge of the Devils Playground in the Mojave River Wash, near the Mollhausen Mountains.

See also

References
 
 

Ergs
Landforms of San Bernardino County, California
Mojave Desert
Mojave National Preserve
Dunes of California